The electron-LA phonon interaction is an interaction that can take place between an electron and a longitudinal acoustic (LA) phonon in a material such as a semiconductor.

Displacement operator of the LA phonon

The equations of motion of the atoms of mass M which locates in the periodic lattice is

 ,

where  is the displacement of the nth atom from their equilibrium positions.

the displacement is given by 

Then using Fourier transform:

 

and

 .

Since  is a Hermite operator,

 

From the definition of the creation and annihilation operator    

  is written as

 

Then  expressed as

 

Hence, using the continuum model, the displacement operator for the 3-dimensional case is

 ,

where  is the unit vector along the displacement direction.

Interaction Hamiltonian

The electron-longitudinal acoustic phonon interaction Hamiltonian is defined as 

 ,

where  is the deformation potential for electron scattering by acoustic phonons.

Inserting the displacement vector to the Hamiltonian results to

Scattering probability

 

 

Replace the integral over the whole space with a summation of unit cell integrations

 

where ,   is the volume of a unit cell.

See also
 Phonon scattering
 Umklapp scattering

Notes

References

 
 

Atomic physics